The Masonic Temple in Yuma, Arizona was built in 1931 in the late Art Deco style of Moderne.  It was designed by Los Angeles-based architects Edward Gray Taylor and Ellis Wing Taylor.  In 1933, at the depth of the Great Depression, the Masonic lodge lost all its funds in a bank closure.  On November 16, 1933, the building's ownership was turned over to the Pacific Mutual Life Insurance Company "in satisfaction of a $16,900 realty mortgage."  It was later rented back to the Masonic chapter and on May 10, 1940, ownership was restored.

It is significant as one of few major Modernist Art Deco Style buildings surviving in Yuma. It was given a "substantive review" indicating historical merit in the Yuma Multiple Resource Area MPS of 1979.  The Masonic Temple was listed on the National Register of Historic Places in 1984.

See also
 List of historic properties in Yuma, Arizona 
 National Register of Historic Places listings in Yuma County, Arizona

References

External links

Buildings and structures in Yuma, Arizona
Masonic buildings in Arizona
Masonic buildings completed in 1931
Clubhouses on the National Register of Historic Places in Arizona
Art Deco architecture in Arizona
National Register of Historic Places in Yuma County, Arizona